Partula faba (bean snail, Partula snail,<ref name="zsl" or Captain Cook's bean snail) is an extinct species of air-breathing tropical land snail, a terrestrial pulmonate gastropod mollusk in the family Partulidae. This species was endemic to Ra'iātea and Tahaa, neighbouring islands which share the same lagoon, in French Polynesia. The species was the first Partula to be recorded.

In captivity
From 1991 zoos in the United Kingdom fought to save this species from extinction. For a while this was successful but a slow decline set in. Bristol Zoo and then Edinburgh Zoo were entrusted with the last-known colony of these snails. This was not a success and the last snail died in February 2016.

Subspecies
The species contained two subspecies.
Partula faba ssp. faba – Raiatea
Partula faba ssp. subangulata – Tahaa

Reasons for decline
The introduction of the small carnivorous snail Euglandina rosea in the 1980s caused the decline of many native species of Partulidae, among them Partula faba.

Notes

References

External links
 
 Partula faba on PartulaPages

Partula (gastropod)
Extinct gastropods
Gastropods described in 1791
Taxa named by Johann Friedrich Gmelin
Taxonomy articles created by Polbot